Vazgen Azrojan (born 22 January 1977) is a retired Armenian ice dancer. He is best known for his partnership with Anastasia Grebenkina with whom he represented Armenia at the 2006 Winter Olympics and won the bronze medal at the 2005 NHK Trophy.

Personal life
He was born on 22 January 1977 in Odessa, Ukrainian SSR. He is the father of Armenian ice dancer Viktoriia Azroian (born 15 July 2003 in Moscow).

Career 
Azrojan placed ninth with Ekaterina Davydova at the 1994 World Junior Championships, representing Russia. The next season, he competed with Elena Kustarova for Russia and placed 17th at the 1995 European Championships.

Azrojan teamed up with Anastasia Grebenkina in 1996 and skated with her until 1998, representing Russia. After their partnership ended, he skated with Tiffany Hyden, representing Armenia. 

Grebenkina and Azrojan reformed their partnership in 2002 to compete for Armenia. They became the first skaters to medal for Armenia at a Grand Prix event, obtaining bronze at the NHK Trophy in 2005. They competed at the 2006 Winter Olympics, finishing 20th. Azrojan was the flag bearer for Armenia at the event.

In September 2006, Grebenkina / Azrojan changed coaches, moving from Alexei Gorshkov to Alexander Zhulin. At the 2006 Cup of China, Grebenkina cut her leg with her own blade during practice, requiring stitches, but was able to compete and finished 6th with Azrojan. The duo retired from competition in 2008.

Programs

With Grebenkina

With Hyden

Competitive highlights

With Grebenkina for Armenia and Russia

With Hyden for Armenia

With Kustarova for Russia

With Davydova for Russia

References

External links 

 Grebenkina-Azroyan.com (archived from original)
 
 

Armenian male ice dancers
Russian male ice dancers
Figure skaters at the 2006 Winter Olympics
Olympic figure skaters of Armenia
1977 births
Living people
Sportspeople from Odesa
Ukrainian people of Armenian descent
Russian figure skating coaches